This is a list of mnemonics used in medicine and medical science, categorized and alphabetized. A mnemonic is any technique that assists the human memory with information retention or retrieval by making abstract or impersonal information more accessible and meaningful, and therefore easier to remember; many of them are acronyms or initialisms which reduce a lengthy set of terms to a single, easy-to-remember word or phrase.

Mnemonics with wikipages

 ABC —  airway, breathing, and circulation
 AEIOU-TIPS — causes of altered mental status
 APGAR — a backronym for appearance, pulse, grimace, activity, respiration (used to assess newborn babies)
 ASHICE — age, sex, history, injuries/illness, condition, ETA/extra information
 FAST — face, arms, speech, time (stroke symptoms)
 Hs and Ts — causes of cardiac arrest
 IS PATH WARM? — suicide risk factors
 OPQRST — onset, provocation, quality, region, severity, time (symptom checklist often used by first responders)
 RICE — rest, ice, compression, elevation (generic treatment strategy for sprains and bruises)
 RNCHAMPS — types of shock
 RPM-30-2-Can Do — START triage criteria
 SOCRATES — used to evaluate characteristics of pain
 SOAP – a technique for writing medical records
 SLUDGE — salivation, lacrimation, urination, defecation, gastric upset, and emesis (effects of nerve agent or organophosphate poisoning)

Anatomy

Anaesthesiology

Anaesthesia machine/room check
MS MAID:

 Monitors (EKG, SpO2, EtCO2, etc.)
 Suction
 Machine check (according to ASA guidelines)
 Airway equipment (ETT, laryngoscope, oral/nasal airway)
 IV equipment
 Drugs (emergency, inductions, NMBs, etc.)

Endotracheal intubation: diagnosis of poor bilateral breath sounds after intubation
DOPE:

 Displaced (usually right mainstem, pyriform fossa, etc.)
 Obstruction (kinked or bitten tube, mucous plug, etc.)
 Pneumothorax (collapsed lung)
 Esophagus

General anaesthesia: equipment check prior to inducing
MALES:

 Masks
 Airways
 Laryngoscopes
 Endotracheal tubes
 Suction/Stylette, bougie

Spinal anaesthesia agents
"Little Boys Prefer Toys":

 Lidocaine
 Bupivacaine
 Procaine
 Tetracaine

Xylocaine: where not to use with epinephrine
"Ears, nose, hose, fingers, and toes"
The vasoconstrictive effects of xylocaine with epinephrine are helpful in providing hemostasis while suturing; however, they may also cause local ischemic necrosis in distal structures such as the digits, tip of nose, penis, ears, etc.
"Digital PEN" – digits, penis, ear, nose

Behavioral science/psychology

Depression: major episode characteristics
SPACE DIGS:

 Sleep disruption
 Psychomotor retardation
 Appetite change
 Concentration loss
 Energy loss
 Depressed mood
 Interest wanes
 Guilt
 Suicidal tendencies

Depression: DSM-V criteria for major depressive disorder
"SIG E CAPS":

 Sleep disturbances
 Interest decreased (anhedonia)
 Guilt and/or feelings of worthlessness
 Energy decreased
 Concentration problems
 Appetite/weight changes
 Psychomotor agitation or retardation
 Suicidal ideation

Gain: primary vs. secondary vs. tertiary
 Primary: patient's psyche improved
 Secondary: symptom sympathy for patient
 Tertiary: therapist's gain

Kubler-Ross dying process: stages
"Death always brings great acceptance":

 Denial
 Anger
 Bargaining
 Grieving
 Acceptance

Middle adolescence (14–17 years): characteristics
HERO:

 Heterosexual/Homosexual crushes
 Education regarding short-term benefits
 Risk-taking
 Omnipotence

Narcolepsy: symptoms, epidemiology
CHAP:

 Cataplexy
 Hallucinations
 Attacks of sleep
 Paralysis on waking
Usual presentation is a young male, hence "chap"

Suicide: risk screening
SAD PERSONS scale:

 Sex (male – completion, female – attempt)
 Age (adolescent or elderly)
 Depression
 Previous attempt
 Ethanol abuse
 Rational thinking loss
 Social support problems
 Organised plan
 No spouse
 Sickness (chronic illness)

Sleep stages: features
Delta waves during Deepest sleep (stages 3 and 4, slow-wave)

dREaM during REM sleep

Impotence causes
PLANE:

 Psychogenic: performance anxiety
 Libido: decreased with androgen deficiency, drugs
 Autonomic neuropathy: impede blood flow redirection
 Nitric oxide deficiency: impaired synthesis, decreased blood pressure
 Erectile reserve: cannot maintain an erection

Male erectile dysfunction (MED): biological causes
MED:

 Medicines (propranolol, methyldopa, SSRIs, etc.)
 Ethanol
 Diabetes mellitus

Premature ejaculation: treatment
2 S's:

 SSRIs
 Squeezing technique (glans pressure before climax)

More detail with 2 more S's:

 Sensate-focus exercises (relieves anxiety)
 Stop and start method (5–6 rehearsals of stopping stimulation before climax)

Biochemistry

B vitamin names
"The rhythm nearly proved contagious":

In increasing order:

 Thiamine (vitamin B1, also spelled thiamin)
 Riboflavin (vitamin B2)
 Niacin (vitamin B3, also called nicotinic acid)
 Pyridoxine (vitamin B6)
 Cobalamin (vitamin B12)

Essential amino acids
"TIM HALL PVT. (Ltd.) always argue and never (get) tire":

 Phe – phenylalanine
 Val – valine
 Thr – threonine
 Trp – tryptophan
 Ile – isoleucine
 Met – methionine
 His – histidine
 Arg – arginine
 Leu – leucine
 Lys – lysine
Always argue: A is for Arg (Arginine) not Asp (Aspartic acid).
'Never tire': T is not Tyr (Tyrosine), but is both Thr (Theronine) and Trp (Tryptophan).
†Note that this initialism uses single letters for each amino acid that are not the same as the standard single-letter codes commonly used in molecular biology to uniquely specify each amino acid; for example, though phenylalanine is represented here by the letter "P", it is formally represented by the letter "F" in most other contexts, and "P" is instead used to formally represent proline.

Fasting state: branched-chain amino acids used by skeletal muscles
"Muscles LIVe fast":

 Leucine
 Isoleucine
 Valine

Fat-soluble vitamins
"The fat (fat-soluble vitamins) cat lives in the ADEK (vitamins A, D, E, and K)."

Folate deficiency: causes
A FOLIC DROP:

 Alcoholism
 Folic acid antagonists
 Oral contraceptives
 Low dietary intake
 Infection with Giardia
 Celiac sprue
 Dilantin
 Relative folate deficiency
 Old
 Pregnant

Glycogen storage: Anderson's (IV) vs. Cori's (III) enzyme defect
ABCD:

 Anderson's = Branching enzyme
 Cori's = Debranching enzyme
Otherwise, cannot really distinguish clinically.

Glycogen storage: names of types I through VI
"Viagra pills cause a major hardon tendency":

 Von Gierke's
 Pompe's
 Cori's
 Anderson's
 McArdle's
 Her's
 Tarui's

Enzyme classes

"'On The Hill, LIL' Transformers":
 1 - Oxidoreductases
 2 - Transferases
 3 - Hydrolases
 4 - Lyases
 5 - Isomerases
 6 - Ligases
 7 - Translocases

Cardiology

Emergency medicine

Acute LVF management
LMNOP:

 Lasix (furosemide)
 Morphine (diamorphine)
 Nitrates
 Oxygen (sit patient up)
 Pulmonary ventilation (if doing badly)

Atrial fibrillation: causes of new onset
THE ATRIAL FIBS:

 Thyroid
 Hypothermia
 Embolism (P.E.)
 Alcohol
 Trauma (cardiac contusion)
 Recent surgery (post CABG)
 Ischemia
 Atrial enlargement
 Lone or idiopathic
 Fever, anemia, high-output states
 Infarct
 Bad valves (mitral stenosis)
 Stimulants (cocaine, theo, amphet, caffeine)

Well's criteria
Secret little TIP (about) blood clots:

Signs/symptoms of PE (3)

PE is the most likely diagnosis (3)

Tachycardia >100bpm (1.5)

Iimmobilisation/surgery in the last 4 weeks (1.5)

Previous DVT/PE

Blood in sputum (haemoptysis) (1)

Active cancer (1)

Two tier score: PE likely > 4

Causes of life-threatening chest pain
PET-MAC

 P = Pulmonary embolism
 E = Esophageal rupture
 T = Tension pneumothorax
 M = Myocardial infarction
 A = Aortic dissection
 C = Cardiac tamponade

GCS intubation
Under 8, intubate.

Ipecac: contraindications
4 C's:

 Comatose
 Convulsing
 Corrosive
 hydrocarbon

JVP: raised JVP differential
PQRST(EKG waves):

 Pericardial effusion
 Quantity of fluid raised (fluid over load)
 Right heart failure
 Superior vena caval obstruction
 Tricuspid stenosis/tricuspid regurgitation/tamponade (cardiac)

MI: immediate treatment
DOGASH:

 Diamorphine
 Oxygen
 GTN spray
 Aspirin 300 mg
 Streptokinase
 Heparin

PEA/asystole (ACLS): cause
ITCHPAD

Infarction

Tension pneumothorax

Cardiac tamponade

Hypovolemia/hypothermia/hypo-,hyperkalemia/hypomagnesmia/hypoxemia

Pulmonary embolism

Acidosis

Drug overdose

Rapid sequence intubation (RSI)
SOAP ME

Suction

Oxygen

Airway equipment

Positioning

Monitoring & medications

EtCO2 & other equipment

Rapid sequence intubation medications (RSI) (CCRx)

Very calmly engage the respiratory system

Vecuronium 0.1 mg/kg

Cisatracurium 0.2 mg/kg

Etomidate 0.3 mg/kg

Rocuronium 0.6 mg/kg-1.2 mg/kg

Succinylcholine 1 mg/kg

Shock: signs and symptoms
TV SPARC CUBE:

Thirst

Vomitting

Sweating

Pulse weak

Anxious

Respirations shallow/rapid

Cool

Cyanotic

Unconscious

BP low

Eyes blank

Shock: types
RN CHAMPS (Alternatively: "MR. C.H. SNAP", or "NH CRAMPS"):

Respiratory

Neurogenic

Cardiogenic

Hemorrhagic

Anaphylactic

Metabolic

Psychogenic

Septic

Subarachnoid hemorrhage (SAH) causes
BATS:

Berry aneurysm

Arteriovenous malformation/adult polycystic kidney disease

Trauma

Stroke

Syncope causes, by system
HEAD HEART VESSELS:

CNS causes include HEAD:

Hypoxia/hypoglycemia

Epilepsy

Anxiety

Dysfunctional brain stem (basivertebral TIA)

Cardiac causes are HEART:

Heart attack

Embolism (PE)

Aortic obstruction (IHSS, AS or myxoma)

Rhythm disturbance, ventricular

Tachycardia

Vascular causes are VESSELS:

Vasovagal

Ectopic (reminds one of hypovolemia)

Situational

Subclavian steal

ENT (glossopharyngeal neuralgia)

Low systemic vascular resistance (Addison's, diabetic vascular neuropathy)

Sensitive carotid sinus

Tension pneumothorax: signs and symptoms
P-THORAX

Pleuritic pain

Tracheal deviation

Hyperresonance

Onset sudden

Reduced breath sounds (and dyspnea)

Absent fremitus

X-ray shows collapse

TWEED SASH
Non-pharmacological analgesia.

Ventricular fibrillation: treatment
Shock, shock, shock, everybody shock, little shock, big shock, momma shock, poppa shock:

Shock= Defibrillate

Everybody= Epinephrine

Little= Lidocaine

Big= Bretylium

Momma= MgSO4

Poppa= Procainamide

Endocrine

Diabetes complications
KNIVES:

Kidney – nephropathy

Neuromuscular – peripheral neuropathy, mononeuritis, amyotrophy

Infective – UTIs, TB

Vascular – coronary/cerebrovascular/peripheral artery disease

Eye – cataracts, retinopathy

Skin – lipohypertrophy/lipoatrophy, necrobiosis lipoidica

Hematology/oncology

Anterior mediastinal masses
4 T's:

Teratoma

Thymoma

Testicular-type

T-cell / Hodgkin's lymphoma

Dermatomyositis or polymyositis: risk of underlying malignancy
Risk is 30% at age 30.
Risk is 40% at age 40, and so on.

Lung cancer: main sites for distant metastases
BLAB:

Bone

Liver

Adrenals

Brain

Esophageal cancer: risk factors
ABCDEF:

Achalasia

Barret's esophagus

Corrosive esophagitis

Diverticuliis

Esophageal web

Familial

Lung cancer: notorious consequences
SPEECH:

Superior vena cava syndrome

Paralysis of diaphragm (phrenic nerve)

Ectopic hormones

Eaton-Lambert syndrome

Clubbing

Horner syndrome/ hoarseness

Mole: signs of trouble
ABCDE:

Asymmetry

Border irregular

Colour irregular

Diameter usually > 0.5 cm

Elevation irregular

Prognotic factors for cancer: general
PROGNOSIS:

Presentation (time & course)

Response to treatment

Old (bad prog.)

Good intervention (i.e. early)

Non-compliance with treatment

Order of differentiation (>1 cell type)

Stage of disease

Ill health

Spread (diffuse)

Pituitary endocrine functions often affected by pituitary-associated tumor
"Go look for the adenoma please":

Tropic hormones affected by growth tumor are:

GnRH

LSH

FSH

ACTH

Prolactin function

Interviewing / physical exam

Abdominal assessment
To assess abdomen, palpate all 4 quadrants for DR. GERM:

Distension: liver problems, bowel obstruction

Rigidity (board like): bleeding

Guarding: muscular tension when touched

Evisceration/ ecchymosis

Rebound tenderness: infection

Masses

Altered level of consciousness: reasons
AEIOU TIPS

Alcohol

Epilepsy, electrolytes, and encephalopathy

Insulin

Overdose, oxygen

Underdose, uremia

Trauma, temperature

Infection

Psychogenic, poisons

Stroke, shock

Deep tendon reflexes (DTR's)

One two, put on my shoe - S1/2 roots for Achilles reflex (foot plantarflexion)

Three four, kick the door - L3/4 roots for patellar reflex (knee extension)

Five six, pick up sticks - C5/6 roots for brachioradialis and biceps brachii reflexes (elbow flexion)

Seven eight, shut the gate - C7/8 roots for triceps brachii reflex (elbow extension)

Cause of symptoms
OPQRST (Works well for cardiac, and respiratory patients.)

Onset of the event

Provocation or palliation

Quality of the pain

Region and radiation

Severity

Time

Fetal monitoring
VEAL CHOP

Neurovascular assessment
5 P's:

Pain

Pallor

Paresthesia

Pulse

Paralysis

Trauma assessment
DCAP-BTLS

Deformities & discolorations

Contusions

Abrasions & avulsion

Penetrations & punctures

Burns

Tenderness

Lacerations

Swelling & symmetry

Toxicological seizures: causes
OTIS CAMPBELL

Organophosphates

Tricyclic antidepressants

Isoniazid, insulin

Sympathomimetics

Camphor, cocaine

Amphetamines

Methylxanthines

PCP, propoxyphene, phenol, propranolol

Benzodiazepine withdrawal, botanicals

Ethanol withdrawal

Lithium, lidocaine

Lindane, lead

Vomiting: non-GIT differential
ABCDEFGHI:

Acute renal failure

Brain [increased ICP]

Cardiac [inferior MI]

DKA

Ears [labyrinthitis]

Foreign substances [paracetamol, theo, etc.]

Glaucoma

Hyperemesis gravidarum

Infection [pyelonephritis, meningitis]

Heart valve auscultation sites
"All patients take meds":

Reading from top left:

Aortic

Pulmonary

Tricuspid

Mitral

Glasgow coma scale: components and numbers
Scale types is 3 V's:

Visual response

Verbal response

Vibratory (motor) response Scale scores are 4,5,6:

Scale of 4: see so much more

Scale of 5: talking jive

Scale of 6: feels the pricks (if testing motor by pain withdrawal)

Mental state examination: stages in order
"Assessed mental state to be positively clinically unremarkable":

Appearance and behaviour [observe state, clothing...]

Mood [recent spirit]

Speech [rate, form, content]

Thinking [thoughts, perceptions]

Behavioural abnormalities

Perception abnormalities

Cognition [time, place, age...]

Understanding of condition [ideas, expectations, concerns]

History
SAMPLE history

Signs and symptoms

Allergies

Medications

Past medical history, injuries, illnesses

Last meal/intake

Events leading up to the injury and/or illness

OPQRST history

Onset of symptoms

Provocation/pallitive

Quality or character of pain

Region of pain or radiation

Signs, symptoms and severity

Time of onset, duration, intensity

Orthopaedic assessment
CLORIDE FPP

Character: sharp or dull pain

Location: region (joint) of origin

Onset: sudden vs. gradual

Radiation:

Intensity: how severe (scale 1–10), impact on ADLs (activities of daily living), is it getting better, worse or staying the same?

Duration: acute vs. chronic

Events associated: falls, morning stiffness, swelling, redness, joint clicking or locking, muscle cramps, muscle wasting, movement limitation, weakness, numbness or tingling, fever, chills, trauma (mechanism of injury), occupation activities, sports, repetitive movements

Frequency: intermittent vs. constant, have you ever had this pain before?

Palliative factors: is there anything that makes it better? (rest, activity, meds, heat, cold)

Provocative factors: is there anything that makes it worse? (rest, activity, etc.)

Pain history checklist
SOCRATES:

Site

Onset

Character

Radiation

Alleviating factors/ associated symptoms

Timing (duration, frequency)

Exacerbating factors

Severity

Alternatively, signs and symptoms with the 'S'

PLOTRADIO

Past history

Location

Onset/offset

Type/character (of pain)

Radiation

Aggravating/alleviating factors

Duration

Intensity

Other associated symptoms

Abdominal swelling causes
9 F's:

Fat

Feces

Fluid

Flatus

Fetus

Full-sized tumors

Full bladder

Fibroids

False pregnancy

Head trauma: rapid neuro exam

12 P's

Psychological (mental) status

Pupils: size, symmetry, reaction

Paired ocular movements

Papilloedema

Pressure (BP, increased ICP)

Pulse and rate

Paralysis, paresis

Pyramidal signs

Pin prick sensory response

Pee (incontinent)

Patellar reflex

Ptosis

Ocular bobbing vs. dipping
"Breakfast is fast, dinner is slow, both go down":

Bobbing is fast

Dipping is slow

In both, the initial movement is down.

Pupillary dilation (persistent): causes
3AM:

3rd nerve palsy

Anti-muscarinic eye drops (e.g. to facilitate fundoscopy)

Myotonic pupil

Clinical examination: initial Inspection of patient from end of bed
ABC:

Appearance (SOB, pain, etc.)

Behaviour

Connections (drips, inhalers, etc. connected to patient)

Differential diagnosis checklist
"A VITAMIN C"

Acquired

Vascular

Inflammatory (infectious and non-infectious)

Trauma/ toxins

Autoimmune

Metabolic

Idiopathic

Neoplastic

Congenital

Primitive reflexes
"Absent reflexes should get paediatrics professors mad"

Absent: asymmetrical tonic neck reflex

Reflexes: rooting reflex

Should: suck reflex

Get: grasp reflex

Paediatrics: placing reflex

Professors: parachute reflex

Mad: Moro reflex

Family history (FH)
BALD CHASM:

Blood pressure (high)

Arthritis

Lung disease

Diabetes

Cancer

Heart disease

Alcoholism

Stroke

Mental health disorders (depression, etc.)

Four point physical assessment of a disease
"I'm a people person"

Inspection

Auscultation

Percussion

Palpation

Medical history: disease checklist
MJ THREADS:

Myocardial infarction

Jaundice

Tuberculosis

Hypertension

Rheumatic fever/ rheumatoid arthritis

Epilepsy

Asthma

Diabetes

Strokes

Past medical history (PMH)
VAMP THIS:

Vices (tobacco, alcohol, other drugs, sexual risks)

Allergies

Medications

Preexisting medical conditions

Trauma

History of hospitalizations

Immunizations

Surgeries

SMASH FM:

Social history

Medical history

Allergies

Surgical history

Hospitalizations

Family history

Medications

Patient examination organization
SOAP:

Subjective: what the patient says.

Objective: what the examiner observes.

Assessment: what the examiner thinks is going on.

Plan: what they intend to do about it

Patient profile (PP)
LADDERS:

Living situation/ lifestyle

Anxiety

Depression

Daily activities (describe a typical day)

Environmental risks / exposure

Relationships

Support system / stress

Physical exam for 'lumps and bumps'
"6 students and 3 teachers go for CAMPFIRE":

Site, size, shape, surface, skin, scar

Tenderness, temperature, transillumination

Consistency

Attachment

Mobility

Pulsation

Fluctuation

Irreducibility

Regional lymph nodes

Edge

Short stature causes
RETARD HEIGHT:

Rickets

Endocrine (cretinism, hypopituitarism, Cushing's)

Turner syndrome

Achondroplasia

Respiratory(suppurative lung disease)

Down syndrome

Hereditary

Environmental (postirradiation, postinfectious)

IUGR

GI (malabsorption)

Heart (congenital heart disease)

Tilted backbone (scoliosis)

Sign vs. symptom
S&S:

Sign: I (the examiner) can detect attributes/reactions without patient description

Symptom: patient only can sense attributes/feelings

Social history
FED TACOS:

Food

Exercise

Drugs

Tobacco

Alcohol

Caffeine

Occupation

Sexual activity

Surgical sieve for diagnostic categories
INVESTIGATIONS:

Iatrogenic

Neoplastic

Vascular

Endocrine

Structural / mechanical

Traumatic

Inflammatory

Genetic / congenital

Autoimmune

Toxic

Infective

Old age / degenerative

Nutritional

Spontaneous / idiopathic

Surgical sieve for diagnostic categories (alternate) 
PAST MIDNIGHT:

Psychological

Autoimmune

Spontaneous/idiopathic

Toxic

Metabolic

Inflammatory

Degenerative

Neoplastic

Infection

Genetic

Hematological

Traumatic

VITAMIN CDEF:

Vascular

Infective/inflammatory

Traumatic

Autoimmune

Metabolic

Iatrogenic/idiopathic

Neoplastic

Congenital

Degenerative/developmental

Endocrine/environmental

Functional

Breast history checklist
LMNOP:

Lump

Mammary changes

Nipple changes

Other symptoms

Patient risk factors

Delivering bad news
SPIKES:

Setting up

Perception

Invitation

Knowledge

Emotions

Strategy and summary

Nephrology

Dialysis: Acute indications

AEIOU

Acidosis (refractory to treatment)

Electrolyte abnormalities (refractory to treatment, e.g. hyperkalemia)

Ingestions (e.g. methanol, ethylene glycol, lithium, salicylates)

Overload (volume overload refractory to IV diuresis)

Uremia (presenting with pericarditis, bleeding, encephalopathy)

Neurology

Chorea: common causes
St. VITUS'S DANCE:

Sydenhams

Vascular

Increased RBC's (polycythemia)

Toxins: CO, Mg, Hg

Uremia

SLE

Senile chorea

Drugs

APLA syndrome

Neurodegenerative conditions: HD, neuroacanthocytosis, DRPLA

Conception related: pregnancy, OCP's

Endocrine: hyperthyroidism, hypo-, hyperglycemia

Congenital myopathy: features
DREAMS:

Dominantly inherited, mostly

Reflexes decreased

Enzymes normal

Apathetic floppy baby

Milestones delayed

Skeletal abnormalities

Dementia: reversible dementia causes
DEMENTIA:

Drugs/depression

Elderly

Multi-infarct/medication

Environmental

Nutritional

Toxins

Ischemia

Alcohol

Friedreich ataxia trinucleotide repeat
"Ataxic GAAit"

Guanine

Adenine

Adenine

Stroke risk factors
HEADS:

Hypertension/ hyperlipidemia

Elderly

Atrial fib

Diabetes mellitus/ drugs (cocaine)

Smoking/sex (male)

Horner syndrome
Horny PAMELA:

Ptosis

Anhydrosis

Miosis

Enophthalmos

Loss of ciliary-spinal reflex

Anisocoria

Cerebellar signs 
DANISH:

Dysdiadochokinesia / dysmetria
Ataxia
Nystagmus (horizontal)
Intention tremor
Slurred speech
Hypotonia

Causes of pinpoint pupils 
Pinpoint pupils are caused by opioids and pontine pathology

Diagnostic criteria of neurofibromatosis type 1 
CAFÉ SPOT:

Café au lait spots
Axillary + inguinal freckling
Fibromas
Eye: Lisch nodules
Sphenoid dysplasia
Positive family history
Optic tumour (glioma)

Features of normal pressure hydrocephalus 
Wet, wobbly, wacky:

Wet = urinary incontinence
Wobbly = ataxic gait
Wacky = dementia

Pathology

Pharmacology

Gynaecomastia causing drugs
Some drugs create awesome knockers

Spironolactone

Digitalis

Cimetidine

Alcohol

Ketoconazole

Psychiatry

Conduct disorder vs. antisocial personality disorder
Conduct disorder is seen in children. Antisocial personality disorder is seen in adults.

Depression: symptoms and signs (DSM-IV criteria)
AWESOME:

Affect flat

Weight change (loss or gain)

Energy, loss of

Sad feelings/ suicide thoughts or plans or attempts/ sexual inhibition/ sleep change (loss or excess) / social withdrawal

Others (guilt, loss of pleasure, hopeless)

Memory loss

Emotional blunting

Depression
UNHAPPINESS:

Understandable (such as bereavement, major stresses)

Neurotic (high anxiety personalities, negative parental upbringing, hypochondriasis)

Agitation (usually organic causes such as dementia)

Pseudodementia

Pain

Importuniing (whingeing, complaining)

Nihilistic

Endogenous

Secondary (i.e. cancer at the head of the pancreas, bronchogenic cancer)

Syndromal

Delirium
DIMES & 3Ps:

Drugs (or withdrawal)

Infection (PUS = Pneumonia, UTI, Skin)

Metabolic (e.g. Na, Ca, TSH)

Environmental

Structural

Pain

Pee

Poo

I WATCH DEATH
Infections – PUS, CNS

Withdrawal – alcohol, sedatives, barbiturates

Acute metabolic changes – pH, hypo/hyper Na, Ca, acute liver or renal failure

Trauma – brain injury, subdural hematoma

CNS – post-ictal, stroke, tumour, brain mets

Hypoxia – CHF, anemia

Deficiencies – thiamine, niacin, B12 (e.g. chronic G and T alcoholics)

Endocrinopathies – hypo-/hyper-cortisol, hypoglycemia

Acute vascular – hypertensive encephalopathy, septic hypotension

Toxins and Drugs – especially anti-cholinergics, opioids, benzodiazepines

Heavy metals

PINCH ME

Pain

Infection

Nutrition

Constipation

Hydration

Medication

Electrolytes

Erikson's developmental stages
"The sad tale of Erikson Motors":

The stages in order by age group:

Mr. Trust and MsTrust had an auto they were ashamed of. She took the initiative to find the guilty party. She found the industry was inferior. They were making cars with dents [identity] and rolling fuses [role confusion]. Mr. N.T. Macy [intimacy] isolated the problem, General TVT absorbed the cost. In the end, they found the tires were just gritty and the should have used de- spare!

Mental state examination
ASEPTIC:

Appearance

Speech

Emotion (objective/subjective)

Perceptions

Thoughts

Insight

Cognition

Mania: cardinal symptoms
DIG FAST:

Distractibility

Indiscretion (DSM-IV's "excessive involvement in pleasurable activities")

Grandiosity

Flight of ideas

Activity increase

Sleep deficit (decreased need for sleep)

Talkativeness (pressured speech)

Mania: diagnostic criteria
Must have 3 of MANIAC:

Mouth (pressure of speech)/ Moodl

Activity increased

Naughty (disinhibition)

Insomnia

Attention (distractibility)

Confidence (grandiose ideas)

Parasomnias: time of onset
Sleep terrors and Sleepwalking occur during Slow-wave sleep (stages 3 & 4).Nightmare occurs during REM sleep (and is remembered).

Psychiatric review of symptoms
"Depressed patients seem anxious, so call psychiatrists":

Depression and other mood disorders (major depression, bipolar disorder, dysthymia)

Personality disorders (primarily borderline personality disorder)

Substance abuse disorders

Anxiety disorders (panic disorder with agoraphobia, obsessive-compulsive disorder)

Somatization disorder, eating disorders (these two disorders are combined because both involve disorders of bodily perception)

Cognitive disorders (dementia, delirium)

Psychotic disorders (schizophrenia, delusional disorder and psychosis accompanying depression, substance abuse or dementia)

Schizophrenia: negative features
4 A's:

Ambivalence

Affective incongruence

Associative loosening

Autism

Substance dependence: features (DSM IV)
WITHDraw IT:

3 of 7 within 12-month period:

Withdrawal

Interest or Important activities given up or reduced

Tolerance

Harm to physical and psychosocial known but continue to use

Desire to cut down, control

Intended time, amount exceeded

Time spent too much

Radiology

Chest radiograph: checklist to examine
"Pamela found our rotation particularly exciting; very highly commended mainly 'cus she arouses":

Patient details

Film details

Objects (e.g. lines, electrodes)

Rotation

Penetration

Expansion

Vessels

Hila

Costophrenic angles

Mediastinum

Cardiothoracic ratio

Soft tissues and bones

Air (diaphragm, pneumothorax, subcut. emphysema)

Chest X-ray interpretation
Preliminary is ABCDEF:

AP or PA

Body position

Confirm name

Date

Exposure

Films for comparison

Analysis is ABCDEF:

Airways (hilar adenopathy or enlargement)

Breast shadows / bones (rib fractures, lytic bone lesions)

Cardiac silhoutte (cardiac enlargement) / costophrenic angles (pleural effusions)

Diaphragm (evidence of free air) / digestive tract

Edges (apices for fibrosis, pneumothorax, pleural thickening or plaques) / extrathoracic tissues

Fields (evidence of alveolar filling) / failure (alveolar air space disease with prominent vascularity with or without pleural effusions)

Chest X-ray: cavitating lesions differential
"If you see holes on chest X-ray, they are weird":

Wegener's granulomatosis (now known as granulomatosis with polyangiitis)

Embolic (pulmonary, septic)

Infection (anaerobes, pneumocystis, TB)

Rheumatoid (necrobiotic nodules)

Developmental cysts (sequestration)

Histiocytosis

Oncological

Lymphangioleiomyomatosis

Environmental, occupational

Sarcoid

Alternatively: L=Left atrial myxoma

Elbow ossification centers, in sequence
CRITOE:

Capitellum

Radial head

Internal epicondyle

Trochlea

Olecranon

External epicondyle

Head CT scan: evaluation checklist
"Blood can be very bad":

Blood

Cistern

Brain

Ventricles

Bone

Neck sagittal x-ray: examination checklist
ABCD:

Anterior: look for swelling

Bones: examine each bone for fractures

Cartilage: look for slipped discs

Dark spots: ensure not abnormally big, or could mean excess blood

Osteoarthritis: x-ray signs
LOSS:

Loss of joint space

Osteopyhtes

Subcondral sclerosis

Subchondral cysts

T2 vs. T1 MRI scan
"WW 2" (World War II):

Water is white in a T2 scan.

Conversely, a T1 scan shows fat as being whiter.

Upper lobe shadowing: causes
BREASTS:

Beryllium

Radiation

Extrinsic allergic alveolitis

Ankylosing spondylitis

Sarcoidosis

TB

Siliconiosis

Respiratory

Airway assessment 
LEMON
 Look
 Evaluate
 Mallampati
 Occlusion
 Neck mobility

PIPPA
 Position 
 Inspection 
 Palpation
 Percussion
 Auscultation

Asthma management 
ASTHMA
 Adrenergic agonists
 Steroids
 Theophylline
 Hydration
 Masked oxygen
 Anticholinergics

COPD assessment test (CAT) 
CAT items: CHEST SEA

To aid memory, think of the chest (or lungs) floating in a sea of yellow sputum, which is commonly seen in COPD.
Cough
Home-leaving confidence
Exercise tolerance (uphill/ 1 flight of stairs)
Sputum (phlegm/ mucus)
Tightness of chest
Sleep
Energy level
ADL at home

Croup symptoms 
 3 S's:
 Stridor
 Subglottic swelling
 Seal-bark cough

Causes of upper zone pulmonary fibrosis 
A TEA SHOP

ABPA
TB
Extrinsic allergic alveolitis
Ankylosing spondylitis
Sarcoidosis
Histiocytosis
Occupational (silicosis, berylliosis)
Pneumoconiosis (coal-worker's)

Features of a life-threatening asthma attack 
A CHEST

Arrhythmia/altered conscious level
Cyanosis, PaCO2 normal
Hypotension, hypoxia (PaO2<8kPa, SpO2 <92%)
Exhaustion
Silent chest
Threatening PEF < 33% best or predicted (in those >5yrs old)

Pulmonary edema: treatment
LMNOP:

Lasix

Morphine

Nitro

Oxygen

Position/positive pressure ventilation

Miscellaneous
The following may or may not fit properly into one of the above categories. They are being stored in this section either temporarily or permanently. Categorize them if needed.

Cholinergic crisis
SLUDGE and the Killer B's:

Salivation

Lacrimation

Urination

Diaphoresis, diarrhea

Gastrointestinal cramping

Emesis

Bradycardia

Bronchospasm

Bronchorrhea

also known as DUMBBELLS

Diarrhea

Urination

Miosis

Bradycardia

Bronchospasm

Emesis

Lacrimation

Loss of muscle strength

Salivation/sweating

Cheyne-Stokes breathing

Cheyne-Stokes breathing sounds like "chain smokes"

Drugs causing gynaecomastia: DISCO

 Digitalis
 Isoniazid
 Spironolactone
 Cimetidine / ketoconazole
 Oestrogen

Drugs for bradycardia and hypotension

Isoproterenol

Dopamine

Epinephrine

Atropine sulfate

Diaphragm innervation
C3, 4, 5 keeps the diaphragm alive

Intubation preparation
7 P's

Preparation

Preoxygenation

Pretreatment

Paralysis with induction

Positioning

Placement of tube

Postintubation management

Pentad of TTP
FAT RN:

Fever
 
Anemia

Thrombocytopenia

Renal

Neuro changes

Systemic lupus erythematosus: diagnostic symptoms

SOAP BRAIN MD

Serositis

Oral ulcers

Arthritis

Photosensitivity, pulmonary fibrosis

Blood cells

Renal, Raynaud's

ANA

Immunologic (anti-Sm, anti-dsDNA)

Neuropsych

Malar rash

Discoid rash however, not in order of diagnostic importance.

References

Further reading
 .
 .
 .
 Epomedicine Medical Mnemonics

Mnemonics